Cochylis yinyangana is a species of moth of the family Tortricidae. It is only known from the White Sands National Park in Otero County, New Mexico and at Carlsbad Caverns National Park in Eddy County, also in New Mexico.

The forewings are yellowish-white. The hindwings are dirty-white with yellowish-white veins.

Etymology
The species name refers the nearly white upper side and blackish underside colors of the forewings and is derived from the phrase yin and yang, often depicted by the black and white circular symbol, Taijitu, which is used to describe how polar opposites are interconnected and interdependent in the totality of the adult moth.

References

External links

Moths described in 2012
yinyangana